Segerblom is a surname. Notable people with the surname include:

Gene Segerblom (1918–2013), American politician
Tick Segerblom (born 1948), American attorney and politician